= Floyd M. Martinson =

American professor

Floyd Mansfield Martinson (1916-2000) was an American academic researcher and author. He was a sociology professor at Gustavus Adolphus College's Department of Sociology.

== Bibliography ==
- Marriage and the American Ideal (1960)
- Growing Up in Norway (1992)
- The Sexual Life of Children (1994)
